Joshua Svec (born June 3, 1987 in Blenheim, Ontario) was a professional Canadian football wide receiver who was briefly a member of the Winnipeg Blue Bombers. He went undrafted in the 2009 CFL Draft. He played CIS football for the Waterloo Warriors and the Western Mustangs.

Currently, Joshua Svec is the Founder & CEO of Air Realty Limited www.airrealty.ca and a Partner with Greener Project Development Inc.

External links
CFL bio

Players of Canadian football from Ontario
Canadian football wide receivers
Waterloo Warriors football players
1987 births
Living people